Iridge Place is a Grade II* listed country house in Hurst Green, East Sussex, England. It dates back to the late 18th century, replacing an earlier house. The two-storey building, with attic, has nine windows at the front and a stuccoed porch with Doric pilasters. Peckham Micklethwait of Iridge Place died in 1853, and the estate passed to Henry Sharnborne Nathaniel Micklethwait.

The local authority for the house is Rother District Council.

Owners
Iridge was a tithing of Henhurst Hundred from  onwards, and first appears as a manor in  when Martin Brabon was in possession of it, the Brabon family having been in residence since at least .

The manor changed hands by marriage and conveyance a number of times during the 17th century, before ending up in the hands of William Peckham at the beginning of the 18th century.

References

Country houses in East Sussex
Grade II* listed houses
Grade II* listed buildings in East Sussex